Jeroen van Veen may refer to:

 Jeroen van Veen (bassist) (born 1974), Dutch bassist with the group Within Temptation
 Jeroen van Veen (pianist) (born 1969), Dutch classical pianist and composer